"Hot Summer Night (Oh La La La)" is a song recorded by Spanish singer David Tavaré, featuring 2 Eivissa who features in the credits (the song uses a vocal sample from 2 Eivissa's "Oh La La La"). Luigi Ricco and Ambrogio Crotti, from "Team 33", who produced the original "Oh La La La", also produced Tavaré's version. It was the second single by the singer and was released first in July 2007 in Spain, where it reached number 2 on music charts. It also reached number two for two non consecutive weeks in France, about a year later.

Track listings
 CD single
 "Hot Summer Night (Oh La La La)" (radio) — 3:10
 "Hot Summer Night (Oh La La La)" (extended) — 5:14
 "Hot Summer Night (Oh La La La)" (33rmxUK) — 3:54
 "Hot Summer Night (Oh La La La)" (video) — 3:06

 CD maxi
 "Hot Summer Night (Oh La La La)" (radio mix) — 3:06
 "Hot Summer Night (Oh La La La)" (Latin mix) — 3:06
 "Hot Summer Night (Oh La La La)" (extended mix) — 5:10
 "Hot Summer Night (Oh La La La)" (video)

 12" maxi
 "Hot Summer Night (Oh La La La)" (radio mix) — 3:06
 "Hot Summer Night (Oh La La La)" (Latin mix) — 3:06
 "Hot Summer Night (Oh La La La)" (extended mix) — 5:10

 Digital download
 "Hot Summer Night (Oh La La La)" (radio) — 3:10
 "Hot Summer Night (Oh La La La)" (extended) — 5:14
 "Hot Summer Night (Oh La La La)" (33rmxUK) — 3:54
 "Hot Summer Night (Oh La La La)" (video) — 3:06

Charts

Peak positions

Year-end charts

References

2007 singles
2008 singles
David Tavaré songs
Electronic songs
Spanish-language songs
Blanco y Negro Records singles
2007 songs